Vlado Misajlovski (born 21 January 1985) is a politician from North Macedonia. He served as Minister of Transport and Communications in the cabinet of Nikola Gruevski from 13 May 2015, until 31 May 2017.

Misajlovski studied in Skopje and obtained a BA in Diplomacy and international politics and an MA in European and international diplomacy and politics. He was director of the state agency for roads before being appointed as Minister.

References

1985 births
Living people
Transport ministers of North Macedonia
Government ministers of North Macedonia